Butte County is a county in the U.S. state of South Dakota. As of the 2020 United States Census, the population was 10,243. Its county seat is Belle Fourche. The county was established in the Dakota Territory on March 2, 1883, and given the descriptive name based on the French word for a hill.

History

Prehistory
In 1975, plesiosaur fossils dating to the Cretaceous Period (ca. 110 million years ago) were discovered in Butte County. In the 1980s, a 90-million-year-old fossil of a clawless lobster was discovered. A Tyrannosaurus rex skeleton was found in 1981.

The early human history of the Belle Fourche River Valley has been traced to about 3000 BC. The first people of the area were Native Americans who resided on the northwestern plains of North America. The earliest known evidence of human activity in the area dates to the Middle Plains Archaic Period of the Plains Indians (ca. 3000–1500 BC). Traces of tipi rings dating from this period have been found. In 1979 and 1980, archeologists excavated a fortified and previously inhabited site west of Belle Fourche that dated to AD 1000. This site was called the Smiley-Evans Site and had been recorded in 1959. Until 1984, only 47 archaeological sites had been recorded, but after the excavation of the Smiley-Evans Site, several investigations were undertaken. , 199 archaeological sites had been discovered in the county.

Geography
Butte County lies on the west edge of South Dakota. Its northwestern boundary line abuts the eastern boundary line of the state of Montana, and its southwestern boundary line abuts the eastern boundary line of the state of Wyoming. The Butte County terrain consists of semi-arid rolling hills cut by drainages oriented NW-SE. A relatively small portion of the area is dedicated to agriculture, including the employment of center pivot irrigation. The terrain slopes to the southeast, and its highest point is on the western boundary line near the SW corner: 3,865' (1178m) ASL.

Major highways

 U.S. Highway 85
 U.S. Highway 212
 South Dakota Highway 34
 South Dakota Highway 79
 South Dakota Highway 168

Adjacent counties

 Harding County - north
 Perkins County - northeast
 Meade County - southeast
 Lawrence County - southwest
 Crook County, Wyoming - west
 Carter County, Montana - northwest

Protected areas
 Belle Fourche Dam State Game Production Area
 Belle Fourche National Wildlife Refuge 
 Newell Lake State Game Production Area
 Newell Lake State Lakeside Use Area
 Rocky Point State Recreation Area

Demographics

2000 census
As of the 2000 census, there were 9,094 people, 3,516 households, and 2,468 families in the county. The population density was 4 people per square mile (2/km2). There were 4,059 housing units at an average density of 2 per square mile (1/km2). The racial makeup of the county was 95.52% White, 0.10% Black or African American, 1.65% Native American, 0.24% Asian, 1.09% from other races, and 1.40% from two or more races. 2.93% of the population were Hispanic or Latino of any race. 37.3% were of German, 10.0% Norwegian, 8.2% United States or American, 7.8% Irish and 7.7% English ancestry.

There were 3,516 households, out of which 35.00% had children under the age of 18 living with them, 57.40% were married couples living together, 9.00% had a female householder with no husband present, and 29.80% were non-families. 25.60% of all households were made up of individuals, and 11.90% had someone living alone who was 65 years of age or older. The average household size was 2.55 and the average family size was 3.07.

The county population contained 28.30% under the age of 18, 7.20% from 18 to 24, 26.00% from 25 to 44, 23.40% from 45 to 64, and 15.20% who were 65 years of age or older. The median age was 38 years. For every 100 females there were 96.90 males. For every 100 females age 18 and over, there were 93.20 males.

The median income for a household in the county was $29,040, and the median income for a family was $34,173. Males had a median income of $26,769 versus $15,758 for females. The per capita income for the county was $13,997. About 9.40% of families and 12.80% of the population were below the poverty line, including 17.40% of those under age 18 and 11.80% of those age 65 or over.

2010 census
As of the 2010 United States Census, there were 10,110 people, 4,160 households, and 2,786 families in the county. The racial makeup of the county was 94.2% white, 1.9% American Indian, 0.2% black or African American, 0.2% Asian, 0.1% Pacific islander, 0.8% from other races, and 2.6% from two or more races. Those of Hispanic or Latino origin made up 3.0% of the population. In terms of ancestry, 40.9% were German, 16.6% were Irish, 15.7% were Norwegian, 10.4% were English, and 5.2% were American.

Of the 4,160 households, 30.5% had children under the age of 18 living with them, 52.3% were married couples living together, 9.8% had a female householder with no husband present, 33.0% were non-families, and 28.5% of all households were made up of individuals. The average household size was 2.40 and the average family size was 2.92. The median age was 41.1 years.

The median income for a household in the county was $39,041 and the median income for a family was $52,829. Males had a median income of $37,429 versus $25,273 for females. The per capita income for the county was $20,418. About 11.5% of families and 15.6% of the population were below the poverty line, including 25.0% of those under age 18 and 8.9% of those age 65 or over.

Communities

Cities
 Belle Fourche (county seat)
 Newell

Towns
 Fruitdale
 Nisland

Census-designated place
 Vale

Unincorporated communities

 Arpan
 Castle Rock
 East Butte
 Hoover
 Minnesela
 West Butte

Townships
 Union
 Vale

Politics
Like most of South Dakota, Butte County is a Republican stronghold. No Democratic presidential candidate has carried Butte County since Franklin D. Roosevelt in 1932. Although Roosevelt in the following election and Lyndon Johnson in 1964, respectively, came within six and fourteen votes of claiming the county during landslide Democratic victories, apart from these instances, no Democratic Presidential candidate since 1920 has reached forty percent of the county’s vote.

See also

National Register of Historic Places listings in Butte County, South Dakota

References

 
1883 establishments in Dakota Territory
Populated places established in 1883

es:Condado de Campbell (Dakota del Sur)